Triathlon and Duathlon competition at the 2014 Asian Beach Games was held in Phuket, Thailand from 15 to 17 November 2014 at Naiyang Beach, Phuket.

Medalists

Duathlon

Triathlon

Medal table

Results

Duathlon

Men's individual
15 November

Women's individual
15 November

Mixed relay
15 November

Triathlon

Men's individual
17 November

Women's individual
17 November

Mixed relay
17 November

References 

Duathlon Results
Triathlon Results

External links 
 

Asian Games
2014 Asian Beach Games events
2014